The Sony Xperia M2 is a mid-range 4G Android smartphone manufactured by Sony which was unveiled on 24 February 2014 at the Mobile World Congress, Barcelona, Spain. It boasts of Sony's new Lifelog app, launched alongside the Sony Xperia Z2 and Sony Xperia Z2 Tablet. The Xperia M2 succeeds the Sony Xperia M with a faster processor and an improved camera.

Technical specifications

Hardware
The Xperia M2 features a 4.8 inch qHD resolution 540×960 px display and a pixel density of 229 ppi. It features an 8 Megapixel camera capable of HDR image snapshots and 1080p Full HD video recording. Xperia M2 is a sealed body cellphone with a 1.2 GHz Qualcomm Snapdragon 400 quad-core processor, Adreno 305 GPU, 1GB LPDDR3 RAM and 8GB of internal flash storage inside packed together with a 2300 mAh non-removable battery. Also it features microSDHC slot which support up to 32GB of additional space. Weighing at 148 g, the phone measures 139.7mm by 71.1mm by 8.6 mm.

Software
Android OS 5.1.1
NFC, Wi-Fi and Bluetooth supported

Variants

References

Android (operating system) devices
Sony smartphones
Discontinued smartphones